The singles discography of American rapper Jay-Z consists of 68 singles as a lead artist, and 51 singles as a featured artist, as well as 14 promotional singles.

The Brooklyn native rapper Jay-Z had success on the Billboard Hot 100 with singles from his debut studio album Reasonable Doubt.  In 1997 he had success outside of the US with singles like "Sunshine" which peaked at number 25 in UK, 18 in Germany and 22 in NZ. His next single "Wishing on a Star" peaked at number 13 in UK being his highest peak on the chart until Hard Knock Life (Ghetto Anthem).  The next single "The City Is Mine was the most successful single of In My Lifetime, Vol. 1. The album peaked at number 3 on the Billboard 200 and it received positive reviews from critics. In 1998 he released the smash hit singles "Can I Get A..." and "Hard Knock Life (Ghetto Anthem)" which peaked at number 19 and 15 on the Hot 100 and had wide success worldwide, too. The singles helped the album Vol. 2... Hard Knock Life to debut at number 1 on the Albums chart and selling over 5 million copies. Vol. 3... Life and Times of S. Carter had hits like "Jigga My Nigga" which peaked at number 1 on the Rap chart and #28 on the Hot 100. Hits like "Girl's Best Friend" and "Big Pimpin'" were released and the later peaked at #18 on the Hot 100 earning a platinum certification by the RIAA. His next album  The Dynasty: Roc La Familia was released shortly after Vol 3. The album sold 500k first week and had the hit "I Just Wanna Love U (Give It 2 Me)" which peaked at number one on the R&B/Hip-Hop chart being his first single to reach that peak. In 2001 he released his classic album The Blueprint which spawned his first top 10 single "Izzo (H.O.V.A.)" which was produced by Kanye West. The Blueprint peaked at number one on the Billboard 200 selling 400k, eventually reaching 2 million. The sequel followed in 2002 and had hits like "'03 Bonnie & Clyde" , "Excuse Me Miss" both peaking inside the top 10 on the Hot 100. The first single was his most successful single worldwide for Jay since "Hard Knock Life (Ghetto Anthem)". The album sold 500k but it received mixed reviews. The Black Album was released and had three hit singles and 2 of them were top 10. The album was considered a classic and Jay said it would be his last album. The project reached #1 on the albums chart and it won a Grammy for  "99 Problems". Even though he said The Black Album would be his last album he released a collaboration EP with Linkin Park spawning a hit single which earned a Grammy.

After he became the president of Def Jam Recordings, Jay-Z released a new album in late 2006 titled Kingdom Come. It spawned the top 10 single "Show Me What You Got", but its other singles were not as successful and some did not even chart. He later collaborated with T.I. on the top 5 and Grammy winning single "Swagga like Us". In 2009, he released The Blueprint 3, which included his first chart-topping single "Empire State of Mind". The singles from the album went on to win several Grammys and peaked high on the charts as well. His 2011 collaborative album with Kanye West, Watch the Throne spawned the hit singles "H•A•M", "Otis", "Gotta Have It", and "Niggas in Paris"; the latter peaked at number 5 on the Hot 100 and sold 5 million units, becoming one of the biggest hits in both rappers' careers. His twelfth studio album Magna Carta Holy Grail was not promoted by any singles. In 2017, he released his thirteenth studio album, 4:44. The album's title track, as well as "The Story of O.J.", both charted in the top 40 on the Hot 100, despite the latter not being released as a single.

As lead artist

As featured artist

Promotional singles

Other charted and certified songs

Other guest appearances

Production discography

Notes

See also 
 Jay-Z albums discography
 The Carters

References

External links 
 Official website
 Jay-Z at AllMusic

Discography
Discographies of American artists
Hip hop discographies
Production discographies